Jett may refer to:

People by surname
Brent W. Jett Jr. (born 1958), American astronaut and naval aviator
Chip Jett (born 1974), American professional poker player; husband of Karina Jett
Dennis Jett (born 1945), American diplomat and academic
E. K. Jett (1893–1965), American radio engineer and Federal Communications Commission member
Jack E. Jett (contemporary), American television talk show host
James Jett (born 1970), American professional football player
Joan Jett (born 1958), American rock musician and actress
Joe Jett (born 1960), American politician from Arkansas
Joey Jett (born 1998), American skateboarder
John Jett (born 1968), American professional football player
Karina Jett (born 1974), Vietnamese-American professional poker player; wife of Chip Jett
Shane Jett (born 1974), American politician from Oklahoma; state legislator
Skyler Jett (born 1950s), American R&B and soul singer
Thomas M. Jett (1862–1939), American politician from Illinois; U.S. representative and jurist
Jordair Jett (born 1991), American basketball player

People by given name
Jett Adore, American burlesque dancer
Jett Howard (born 2003), American basketball player
Jett Pangan (born 1968), Filipino singer and guitarist
Jett Thomas (1776–1817), American military officer and builder
Jett Williams (born 1953), American country music performer

Other uses
Jett (TV series)
JETT customer experience, Chinese consultant firm
Jett Rebel, stage name of Jelte Steven Tuinstra
Jett, a character in the TV series Super Wings
Jett, a character in the video game Valorant
Jett, racehorse who finished 8th in the 2021 Grand National and led for most of the race.